Elyse Null ( Hopfner-Hibbs, born September 12, 1989) is a Canadian former elite gymnast, UCLA gymnastics alumna, and YouTube personality. She was born in Mississauga, Ontario.

Elite career
She first started gymnastics in 1993, and competed in her first international event in 2001.

Hopfner-Hibbs won four medals at the 2006 Commonwealth Games: team bronze, gold in the women's uneven bars and women's beam, and silver in the women's all-around. She did not take the all-around title, despite having achieved the same score as eventual winner Chloe Sims of Australia. The new tie break rule had to be used to separate them (previously ties were not uncommon in gymnastics, even in the all-around). Sims did, however, invite Hopfner-Hibbs onto the gold medal podium with her. Despite this, Hopfner-Hibbs finished the championship as one of the most decorated gymnasts at the event, tying with Hollie Dykes of Australia for the highest medal total.

In the 2006 World Championships, Hopfner-Hibbs won a bronze medal on the beam, the first medal ever for a Canadian woman at the World Championships. Since then she has won six World Cup medals on the beam and the uneven bars.

Hopfner-Hibbs competed in the 2008 Olympics in Beijing. She did not qualify to any event finals due to some errors in the preliminaries, but placed 16th in the individual all-around final.

College career

She entered UCLA on an NCAA scholarship in 2008 and was named Freshman of the Year in the Pac-10 Conference in 2009. She also finished 7th in the individual all-around competition at the 2009 NCAA National Championship, and was a second team All-American on vault, floor, uneven bars and in the all-around. In 2010, Elyse was a member of the national championship-winning UCLA team.

Post-Retirement

On May 1, 2015, she married Grayson Null in California. Grayson is the younger brother of YouTube personality Austin Null from The Nive Nulls. They also decided to start their own YouTube channel called Meet The Nulls. In May 2016, the couple announced, via YouTube, that they are expecting their first child. On November 27, 2016, they welcomed a baby girl, Scarlett Everly Null. 
On June 3, 2018, they welcomed their second child, a son called River Kobe Null. On January 2, 2020, they announced that they were expecting their third child, but on February 14, 2020, Elyse announced that they had miscarried their baby, a son who they later named Finn Josiah Null. On June 17, 2020, the couple announced another pregnancy. On January 7, 2021, they welcomed another son named Oaklen Kove Null.

Skills

Vault - 1 Twisting Yurchenko 
Uneven bars - Yarotska; Giant 1/1 Pirouette; Giant 1/2 Pirouette; Khorkina; Giant 1 Pirouette; Piked Jaeger; Church; Toe-on 1/1 Pirouette; Overshoot to Handstand; Stalder Hecht; Giant 1/2 Pirouette; Double Front Tuck Dismout 
Balance Beam - Front Handspring Mount; Aerial to Back Layout to Back Layout; Illusion; Double Turn; Front Tuck; Switch Leap to Roundoff Aerial; Double Back Somersault Dismount
Floor Exercise - Triple Turn; Full Twisting Double Back; Arabian Double Front; Double Back Pike; 1.5 to a full twist

Eponymous skill
Hopfner-Hibbs has one eponymous skill listed in the Code of Points.

References

External links
 
 Elyse Hopfner-Hibbs at Gymnastics Canada
 
 
 
 

1989 births
Living people
Canadian female artistic gymnasts
Gymnasts at the 2006 Commonwealth Games
Commonwealth Games gold medallists for Canada
Gymnasts at the 2008 Summer Olympics
Olympic gymnasts of Canada
Medalists at the World Artistic Gymnastics Championships
Sportspeople from Mississauga
Commonwealth Games silver medallists for Canada
Commonwealth Games bronze medallists for Canada
Commonwealth Games medallists in gymnastics
Originators of elements in artistic gymnastics
NCAA gymnasts who have scored a perfect 10
20th-century Canadian women
21st-century Canadian women
UCLA Bruins women's gymnasts
Medallists at the 2006 Commonwealth Games